"Tk’tk’tk" is a science fiction short story written in 2005 by David D. Levine. 
It received the 2006 Hugo Award for Best Short Story.

Premise
The story is about a penniless human salesman trying to sell software on an alien planet populated by giant, intelligent, impersonal (yet very humble) insects, many light years from Earth. The main character, Walker, has trouble with everything from his ability to sell his computer systems and gadgets, to paying for his hotel and participating in the local religious holiday. In the end he finds a uniquely spiritual restaurant that changes his life.

Adaptations

Audio
Escape Pod published EP054: Tk’tk’tk read by Paul Tevis on May 18, 2006.

External links

"Tk'tk'tk" - at Asimov's Science Fiction
EP054: Tk’tk’tk at Escape Pod

2005 short stories
Science fiction short stories
Hugo Award for Best Short Story winning works
Works originally published in Asimov's Science Fiction
2000s science fiction works